Dreaming Through the Noise is singer-songwriter Vienna Teng's third album.

Track listing
All songs written by Vienna Teng.
"Blue Caravan" - 3:56
"Whatever You Want" - 4:00
"Love Turns 40" - 5:12
"I Don't Feel So Well" - 4:16
"City Hall" - 4:48
"Nothing Without You" - 3:39
"Transcontinental, 1:30 A.M." - 3:46
"1BR/1BA" - 4:02
"Now Three" - 3:04
"Pontchartrain" - 6:15
"Recessional" - 4:05

Band

Strings arranged by Mark Orton.
Engineered and mixed by Helik Hadar.

References 

2006 albums
Vienna Teng albums
Albums produced by Larry Klein
Rounder Records albums
Zoë Records albums